Jane and the Dragon is a CGI children's animated television series based on the books of the same name by Martin Baynton. The show is directed by Mike Fallows and the motion capture is directed by Peter Salmon; it is co-produced by Weta Workshop (as Weta Productions) in New Zealand and Nelvana Limited in Canada. The series follows the comedic exploits of Jane, an adolescent girl training to be a knight, and her friend, Dragon, a talking, flying, 300-year-old, fire-breathing dragon.

The program originally aired on YTV in Canada and on ABC in Australia. From September 9, 2006, to February 26, 2021, it returned on the Qubo weekend lineup until the network's shutdown in 2021. It can be seen on Five in the UK. In American broadcasts, it bears the E/I bug. Episodes are available as part of the "Kids Suite" sold via Bell/Rogers in Canada, and are broadcast on Tuesdays on Disney Junior on the Disney Channel. It has also been on Treehouse TV.

About the series
Jane is a redheaded, pre-teenaged girl who lives in the late 18th or early 19th century Kippernia Castle in a small fictional kingdom called Kippernium located in southern England.

According to the backstory explained in the opening theme song, Jane was being trained to become a lady-in-waiting but had always dreamed of becoming a knight. When the prince is kidnapped by a dragon, Jane sets out to slay the beast. When Jane brings the prince back, the king makes her a knight apprentice. Jane and the dragon end up becoming best friends. Further details of this early adventure are never explained in the series. They are, however, explained in detail in the book Jane and the Dragon by Martin Baynton.

The series that focuses on Jane's interactions with the rest of the castle's residents and their frequent adventures. Themes of integrity, loyalty, friendship, and courage are woven through the stories. Jane frequently makes errors in judgment, but every episode ends happily.

As a knight apprentice, Jane trains and performs various tasks and duties around the castle. Her master is wise Sir Theodore. Sir Ivon, a valiant but somewhat comical knight, has an apprentice of his own named Gunther, a boy whose integrity seems outwardly questionable, and whom Jane views as a rival.

Dragon helps Jane as she trains to become a knight. When she is on patrol duty, he lets her ride on his back as he flies around the kingdom. Jane, in turn, helps Dragon, who is an orphan, in his efforts to uncover the secrets of his ancestry.

In addition to her best friend, Dragon, Jane has several other friends among the castle staff. Jester the royal jester, Pepper the castle cook, and Rake the castle gardener are all about Jane's age. She is also friends with Smithy, the castle blacksmith and stable hand.

Also residing in the castle are the King and Queen, their two children, Jane's parents, and the wizard. The only non-resident of the castle seen is Gunther's father, a merchant who has regular dealings with Jane's father and the king. No other characters are seen or heard in the series. The wizard is never seen but he lives in a tower, in the far corner of the Royal Gardens near the castle. He is seemingly knowledgeable in alchemy. The younger members of the castle staff appear to be afraid of him, for some reason.

While hoping to preserve verisimilitude in its portrait of the earthy characters inhabiting a medieval castle Baynton engineered into his depiction substitute swear words to avoid controversy with parents. When frustrated or exasperated Jane is prone to exclaiming "Maggots!". In this manner the series taps into the imagination of children, encouraging them to find their own expressions that can be much more fun and creative and colourful than conventional profanity without being offensive.

Characters
The characters were voice acted (in English) by the Canadian actors credited below and physically performed and motion-captured by a team of 5 actors at Weta Productions in New Zealand.

 Jane Turnkey (voiced by Tajja Isen, motion-captured by Angela Green) – 12-year-old Jane is a young skinny girl (the TV series occurs 2 years after the novel where she was 10) and the daughter of The King's Chamberlain and the Queen's Lady-in-Waiting. She has green eyes and wavy light red hair. She found her life as a future lady-in-waiting to be boring, and wanted to become a knight and experience adventure. When she heard that the King's son Prince Cuthbert had been kidnapped by a dragon, she set out to rescue him and slay the dragon. However, upon meeting the dragon Jane befriended him instead. Her courage in rescuing the prince led the King to make Jane a knight's apprentice, and she has been training hard ever since. While it's unknown if she is aware that her maternal grandfather was a knight, she doesn't know that in fact both her grandfathers were knights. Jane is close friends with Jester, Pepper, Smithy, and Rake, and has a fierce rivalry with her fellow apprentice, Gunther, but most of her time is spent with Dragon, exploring tunnels in his cave, studying Dragon Runes, or patrolling. Jester is Jane's closest human friend, whom she often confides in about her various problems, and drags along on some of her adventures. Jester has romantic feelings for Jane and in the episode "Mismatched", it is implied that Jane returns these feelings. Gunther and Jane have a strong rivalry as the castle's only two squires, though on some occasions they have been known to be civil and compassionate towards each other. Jane wields a very special sword, which she found in Dragon's cave. It is made of special metals and was forged by the fire of dragons. Its unique properties make it capable of piercing dragon skin (which most ordinary weapons can not do, since dragon skin is so thick and hard). However, since Dragon trusts Jane entirely, and since Jane has vowed to protect Dragon at all costs, he does not mind her use of the sword. The sword's hilt also doubles as a special type of removable whistle, which, when attached and twirled around on a long string, lets out a sound that Dragon can hear from great distances. It is very effective for calling Dragon to Jane's aid when she needs him.
Cleva – Jane's horse.
 Milton Turnkey (voiced by Ben Campbell, motion-captured by Aaron Alexander) – 38-year-old Milton Turnkey is the royal Chamberlain as well as Jane's father. The son of a knight, his father died in battle defending the castle. He oversees all of the kingdom's finances and negotiates trade deals with the surrounding kingdoms. He is very intelligent and, despite having to deal with financial matters on a daily basis, he is far from greedy and is quite humble. He loves his family very much, almost to the point of being a bit overprotective of Jane at times (a trait he shares with Dragon) and is generally supportive of Jane's efforts at knighthood and helps both her and Dragon when the need arises. The efforts of the Merchant to try and swindle the kingdom, as well as King Caradoc's occasional spending splurges can at times prove to be great sources of stress for him.
 Adeline Turnkey (voiced by Jill Frappier) – 36-year-old Adeline Turnkey (née d'Ark), is the Queen's Lady-in-Waiting. She was born in the year 776 to Sir John d'Ark, the First Knight of the King. Her maiden name resembles that of the famous real-life female warrior, Joan of Arc. She loves her family, but her relationship with Jane can be strained at times. She has concerns over Jane's plan to become a knight and does not always approve of the influence that Dragon seems to have over her daughter. She would have preferred it if Jane had instead followed in her footsteps and wanted to become a lady-in-waiting. She also opposes some of Jane's tomboyish looks and behaviors, to the point that she forbids Jane from attending a royal ball unless she wears a dress, for fear of embarrassment (resulting in Jane and the other children holding their own dance in the courtyard, away from the adults). For the most part, Jane's mother seems to be content with her life and her position.
 Dragon (voiced by Adrian Truss) – Dragon is a young member of an airborne herbivore species of dinosaur who evolved over millions of years from carnivorous ground-dragons. He is Jane's best friend and is usually there when she needs him. He himself indicates that he is at least 200 years old in the series. A tapestry created on the castle's creation (allegedly 300 years ago) depicts him as a hatchling. Outside of the show, creators have described him as 300 years old (with a potential to live 1000) and born "about 300 years ago" in a cave not far from the castle. It is there that he meets Jane for the very first time. His home is actually on the mountain, full of secret tunnels and traps. Dragon is an orphan, so he had to teach himself how to fly as well as other things to survive. As a baby, he was captured by humans and kept as a pet, and was traded many times before escaping. He taught himself how to speak and stayed away from all humans, whom he would call a "short-life". After many years, he set out on a mission to discover more about the history of dragons. Dragon saw a rune in the dragon language on his cave wall, that had been left by his father many centuries before, that indicated a child. Thinking Prince Cuthbert was that child, and that he may be able to help explain what happened to the other dragons (which had long since vanished), he swooped down and took him, hoping he could help decipher the runes. But the prince was no help at all. Meanwhile, at the castle, Jane realized this was her opportunity to finally use her secret training and she journeyed to the cave, with plans to slay Dragon. Soon, however, she realized Dragon was friendly and brought back the prince, to everyone's relief. The King, in gratitude, made Jane a squire—a knight in training. After being discovered by Jane, he accompanied her and helped her with her goal of becoming a knight. He is also friends with Jane's friends Rake, Smithy, Pepper, and Jester. Dragon enjoys toilet jokes, burning things, teasing Jane and her friends, lazing about the castle, and having adventures. Despite being centuries old, Dragon has a very childlike and innocent personality and is extremely friendly. However, he can be very protective and quick to anger if he thinks his friends, especially Jane, are threatened, and he will consider any challenge to Jane's honor to mean a challenge to his own as well. Dragon is also known to be a very talented singer, possessing a splendid falsetto voice, though he does not like admitting it. Dragon gets his ability to fly with such relatively small wings by storing the methane gas produced from the foods he eats. The gas is stored in two sac-like organs in his body. The lighter-than-air gas reduces his weight and allows him to fly surprisingly fast for a creature of his size. The drawback is that the very same gas also fuels his fire-breath. If Dragon were to use up his gas reserves in a fight (or a fit of sneezing) he would be unable to fly until he ate and produced more gas to replace what was used. He can help increase his potential for fiery breath by consuming raw iron. Both his sight and his hearing are far better than a human's. Though Dragon has been known to fly the other children around when needed or at Jane's request, he has never let any of the kingdom's adults ride him. Dragon's scales often cause him great itching, which has been referenced several times in the series. Short-life weapons cannot pierce Dragon's skin, but is sensitive enough that Jane can tickle him. He has a very big heart (physically and emotionally). He is also very attracted to cows and finds their general shape and behavior amusing, especially their mooing.
 Jester (voiced by Mark Rendall, motion-captured by Aaron Alexander) – 14-year-old Jester is the jester of the king's royal court. He was left at the castle at the age of 7 by his parents who thought it was best for him. Because of his multitude of talents which include reading, singing, composing, dancing, juggling, cartwheeling, and entertaining with marionettes, he was appointed to the title of royal court jester. He is not paid for his services but receives free education and housing (of which, considering the time period, the education alone would be highly valuable). Jester, whose real name he keeps a secret, is generous and gifted with an excellent memory and a quick wit. There have been occasions when his quick wit has gotten him into trouble with authority, but Jester always means well and would never deliberately hurt another person's feelings. Jester is Jane's "best human friend", and extremely loyal; he often provides her with encouragement and was the first person to help Jane on her path to becoming a knight by smuggling her a suit of armor. He also harbors romantic feelings for her, and it is slightly suggested that she might like him in return. Beneath his hat (his entire outfit is based on puzzle pieces) he has a dirty blonde hair color. Dragon calls him "Floppy Hat" and "Jingle-Boy". Jester has an interesting Roman name. Gunther thinks it must be embarrassing. One day he will reveal his name to Jane.
 Jethro "Smithy" Junior (voiced by Alex House, motion-captured by David Hoskins) – 14-year-old Smithy is the castle blacksmith/stable hand. He keeps the horses shod, the swords sharp, and the armor in good repair. He has invented many labor-saving devices for the castle. He also has a way with animals, a calm confidence that all creatures seem to respond to—all except Dragon.Smithy is calm, caring, and quiet. He is also the most mature of Jane's friends and always keeps his head in an emergency. Although he is always willing to help a friend, Smithy will seldom ask for help himself. Dragon's clumsiness goes hard for Smithy, who often has to clean up after him or find ways to salvage burnt items.  His father either ran off or died in his earlier years. This is mentioned in the episode when Dragon and Jane are stuck in a cave-in.
Pig – Smithy has a pet female pig called "Pig". She often runs in a wheel that pumps the bellows for his fire, and Smithy says he cares about her just like Jane does Dragon. He describes her as "never gets too tired" and "is always there for me".
Verbena "Pepper" Salter (voiced by Sunday Muse, motion-captured by Ban Abdul) – 12-year-old Pepper is the castle cook. Although the same age as Jane, she is not as slim and has developed womanly curves earlier than her. Her parents work at salting herring and they took her to the castle to find better work for her. As a cook, she works long hours in the royal kitchens and is rarely able to go outside, which is why she has a pale complexion. Pepper loves cooking and puts a lot of effort into experimenting with new dishes.  She uses many strange expressions, such as "lovely as linen", "top table!" and "clean as a cauliflower", and can be shy, but is always ready to help her friends. She is especially close to Rake, indicating a budding romance between the two. She has hugged Rake after receiving a flower from him.
Drake "Rake" Gardener Junior (voiced by Will Seatle Bowes, motion-captured by Nick Blake) – 13-year-old Rake is the royal gardener. He is introverted and deeply devoted to his craft. His gardening talents are displayed in the topiary of the Royal Garden, although he seems to spend more time growing foodstuffs than maintaining ornamental plants. He also has his own compost pile, which he maintains by himself (this helps relieve the castle of Dragon's foul-smelling waste). He plans to make his compost famous throughout the kingdom. He has rarely been outside the castle walls, or even to the higher places within the castle. The only recorded time he has left the castle is to go out with Jane and Dragon to collect herbs and plants from the forest, mostly as a gesture to give Pepper new spices and herbs for her cooking. There is an indication that he is afraid of dark stairs, but he does not show signs of claustrophobia in the castle's kitchens. He may be acrophobic, as evidenced by his fear of stairs, and when riding Dragon he at first did not want to open his eyes and look down. He is afraid of the wizard who also lives in the castle. He has also expressed fear of Dragon. He and Pepper, the cook, are openly affectionate to one another, hinting at a budding romance between the two.
Gunther Breech (voiced by Noah Reid, motion-captured by David Hoskins) – 14-year-old Gunther is the loner of the castle. He struggles to balance his loyalty to his merchant father and his loyalty to the Knight's Code of Honour. Gunther's father Magnus believes that being a knight is simply about being a good swordsman, and has no problem with coercing Gunther into dishonorable activities. These situations reveal Gunther's greatest strength: his quick and resourceful thinking. Gunther often manages to resolve the sticky situations his father creates without damaging the merchant's reputation. Although Gunther cannot be relied upon to always make an ethical decision, he usually will act morally by the end of an episode. He can easily best Jane when it comes to strength, but lacks her nimble feet and people skills and so is far less popular with others. Gunther is secretly jealous of Jane, and the two of them are in constant competition for which of the two is the better knight in training. Working for his father often causes Gunther to fall behind with his studies. Because Jane does not have the same problem, Gunther occasionally attempts to level the playing field. For example, when Dragon inadvertently reveals Jane's fear of the dark and Gunther finds out, Jane reminds Gunther that it is against the Code to reveal a weakness of a fellow knight. Gunther then asks Sir Ivon about having the maze test at night, without explicitly mentioning Jane's fear of the dark, thus exploiting Jane's weakness without directly violating the Code. Many fans  speculate that Gunther and Jane could be romantically linked, due to the constant teasing and needing to prove themselves to each other. When members of the castle witnessed Gunther teasing Jane and assumed that they were sweethearts, however later it is shown that Jester and Jane possibly feel something for each other. Gunther has mentioned having a "lady friend" fond of roses, after having earlier seen Princess Lavinia and Jane (a former lady-in-waiting) carrying some.
Magnus Breech (voiced by Clive Walton, motion-captured by Aaron Alexander) – 41-year-old Magnus Breech is a wealthy merchant as well as Gunther's father. He is greedy and does things such as making a fake dragon egg and having Gunther steal a dragon's tooth just to get money. He hates Dragon and is always trying to get him to leave the kingdom, one way or another. His family is not well thought of in Kippernia, as they started their fortune by trading with enemy forces when the castle was under siege two generations ago.
King Caradoc (voiced by Juan Chioran, motion-captured by Nick Blake) – 30-year-old King Caradoc Cedric Bartok Kippernook is a good-humored soul but has little patience for the affairs of state (though he is concerned for his subjects and will listen to their concerns openly). He much prefers hunting, fishing, and dancing - a lifestyle that has put a considerable financial strain on the kingdom. This is shown when he spends a large amount of money on a portrait of his queen. He also loves cabbage. He is the younger brother to the real "King Caradoc" (died before crowning), keeping his brother's name so people remember him (his own boyhood name was "Rathbonne"). In many ways, he can be childish and is prone to bursts of innocent and childlike enthusiasm. In some ways, his children (the young prince and princess) can seem even more mature than he is. However, it is not uncommon to hear great wisdom and insight come from his lips when the need arises. He loves his family and cares about his subjects very much.
Queen Gwendolyn (voiced by Alex Belcourt) – 28-year-old Queen Gwendolyn Hulda Ankarcrona Kippernook comes from Scandinavia. She is the daughter of a noble family and came to England on a business trip with her father, where she eventually fell in love with and married Caradoc. She is beautiful, kind, and gentle, and because of this everyone is in awe of her. Jane believes the king's support and her mother's gradual acceptance of Jane's knightly aspirations is because of the queen's urgings in private. Gwendolyn desires to build a peaceful world for her children to live in. She can, however, be somewhat shallow over her own physical appearance at times. She is very conscious of how other people view her. She feels the pressures of being expected to be beautiful and ladylike since she is the queen. Her favorite food is peas.
Prince Cuthbert (voiced by Cameron Ansell, motion-captured by David Hoskins) – 8-year-old Prince Cuthbert Hakan Kippernook is the heir apparent of the kingdom. Born a sickly child, he was pampered and doted on by his parents as well as the court staff. A selfish child, he tends to take what he wants and is very hard to impress. His life hit a sour note on the birth of his sister, which meant he had to now share all the affection that was previously reserved for him. Cuthbert usually thinks about short-term goals; he is focused on avoiding work and enjoying food, but he also desires his parents to be proud of him. The prince had been kidnapped by Dragon (prior to the start of the series), precipitating the friendship between Jane and Dragon. He seems to hold no ill feelings or resentment towards Dragon for his kidnapping. Despite his flaws, Cuthbert has a soft spot for animals, and considers hunting a cruel and unnecessary sport.
Princess Lavinia (voiced by Isabel De Carteret, motion-captured by Ban Abdul) – 6-year-old Princess Lavinia Pernilla Kippernook is a sweet, caring little girl. She looks up to Jane as a true hero. She sometimes dreams of becoming a knight like Jane, and will often pay more heed to Jane than she will to her parents. Lavinia sometimes wears a pair of costume dragon wings which were made for her by Smithy so she could pretend to be a dragon. She enjoys playing games, looking through Rake's garden and hearing stories from Jane. She loves Dragon and like her brother, also has a soft spot for animals and finds hunting to be a rather poor and cruel sport. Her favorite food is strawberries.
Sir Theodore Boarmaster (voiced by Aron Tager, motion-captured by Nick Blake) – 66-year-old Sir Theodore is a wise knight. As Jane's mentor, he displays patience and understanding. He was best friends with Jane's paternal grandfather, who was also a knight and who died in battle protecting the castle. He has sworn to Jane's mother to never tell Jane about it, but with the way Jane pokes around, it is only a matter of time before the truth is revealed. His family comes from a long line of dragonslayers, which is revealed one day when Jane stumbles upon his family's broken ancestral sword, hidden in his clothing chest. The sword is a dragon blade like Jane's, only the blade has the pointed half missing, with a grey carving of a dragon being pierced with a sword. When confronted with his family's past actions, Sir Theodore begs for Dragon's forgiveness for his ancestors' cruel behavior. Dragon shows that all is forgiven by melting Sir Theodore's sword into molten rubble. This leaves Jane with the only known sword capable of harming Dragon. She offered at that time to also have her sword burned, but since Jane will only use her sword to defend Dragon, he once again reiterates his trust of her with its use.
Trencher – Trencher is Sir Theodore's trained falcon and Jane is being trained in falconry with him.
Sir Ivon Mackay (voiced by Ben Campbell, motion-captured by David Hoskins) – 44-year-old Sir Ivon is loud, enthusiastic, short-tempered, and very Scottish. He is also Gunther's mentor. He has a deep love of weapons of any kind, from swords and axes to the fearsome chopping-machines he invents himself. None of the gadgets he invents have been shown to work, including his "Bowling Ball of Doom", "Boomerang of Vengeance", or "Fearsome Fool Flattener"; they all backfire. Despite his love of violence and fighting, he has a kind underlying nature, although this is often canceled out by his impatience. He tries to do his best with Gunther, but it is clear he is oblivious to the Merchant's manipulations, and often gives his young apprentice odious chores as punishment for his short-comings.

Episodes

Awards and nominations
The show was nominated for an Annie Award for Best Animated Television Production in 2007.

Reception
Andrea Graham of Common Sense Media gave it 5 out of 5 stars and called it "a soaring delight." Graham also wrote: "With its lovable characters, engaging story lines, and wit reminiscent of the Shrek series, Jane and the Dragon may capture the attention of the entire family."

References

External links

 Dragonblade - A Jane and the Dragon novel by Martin Baynton
 The Royal Archives – official site (archived)
 Nelvana press release regarding production of programme
 YTV's Jane and the Dragon site
 Weta Workshop's Jane and the Dragon Section
 TFL.org approved Fanlisting
 Article describing the motion capture technology used on the show
 Brief article (with images) from Weta about filming the motion capture sessions
 

2000s Canadian animated television series
2005 Canadian television series debuts
2005 New Zealand television series debuts
2006 Canadian television series endings
2006 New Zealand television series endings
Canadian computer-animated television series
Canadian children's animated comedy television series
Canadian children's animated fantasy television series
Canadian television shows based on children's books
New Zealand children's animated comedy television series
New Zealand children's animated fantasy television series
English-language television shows
Animated television series about children
Animated television series about dragons
Television series set in the Middle Ages
Television series by Nelvana
Television series by Corus Entertainment
Treehouse TV original programming
YTV (Canadian TV channel) original programming